Archernis scopulalis is a moth in the family Crambidae. It was described by Francis Walker in 1865. It is found in Indonesia, where it has been recorded Flores.

References

Moths described in 1865
Spilomelinae
Moths of Indonesia